Las Ruedas de Ocón or just Las Ruedas is a village in the municipality of Ocón, in the province and autonomous community of La Rioja, Spain. As of 2018 had a population of 30 people.

References

Populated places in La Rioja (Spain)